Fernando Daniel Brandán (born 27 March 1990) is an Argentine footballer currently playing for All Boys.

Club career
Brandán joined Melbourne City in July 2016, after having previously played for Racing de Olavarría, Club Rivadavia and Club Atlético Temperley. Brandán made his unofficial City debut in a 4–0 pre-season victory over NPL Victoria side Melbourne Knights FC. Brandán ruptured his ACL during training for the 2017-18 season and did not appear for the team. On 18 December 2017, it was announced that Melbourne City and Brandán had parted ways with Brandán returning to Atlético Temperley. At the end of the 2017/2018 season, after Atlético Temperley was relegated to Liga B Nacional, Brandan moved to Club Atlético San Martín.

Honours

Club

Melbourne City
 FFA Cup: 2016

References

External links
 

1990 births
Living people
Argentine footballers
Argentine sportspeople of Italian descent
Argentine expatriate footballers
Argentina international footballers
Racing de Olavarría footballers
Melbourne City FC players
Club Atlético Temperley footballers
San Martín de San Juan footballers
San Martín de Tucumán footballers
Villa Dálmine footballers
Lija Athletic F.C. players
All Boys footballers
A-League Men players
Argentine Primera División players
Primera Nacional players
Primera B Metropolitana players
Torneo Federal A players
Maltese Premier League players
Association football wingers
Argentine expatriate sportspeople in Australia
Argentine expatriate sportspeople in Malta
Expatriate soccer players in Australia
Expatriate footballers in Malta
People from Salta
Sportspeople from Salta Province